Xylococcidae is a family of scales and mealybugs in the order Hemiptera. There are at least 4 genera and about 11 described species in Xylococcidae.

Genera
These four genera belong to the family Xylococcidae:
 Jansenus Foldi, 1997
 Xylococculus Morrison, 1927
 Xylococcus Lôw, 1882
 † Baisococcus Koteja, 1989

References

Further reading

 

Scale insects
Hemiptera families